Pablo Arosemena Alba (24 September 1836, in Panama City – 19 August 1920) was the first presidential designate of Panama at the time of resignation of Carlos Antonio Mendoza, and in that capacity became the President of Panama from 5 October 1910 to 1 October 1912

He was elected as the first presidential designate by the National Assembly for the term 1904-1906 and again for the term 1910–1912.

References

1836 births
1920 deaths
People from Panama City
Panamanian Roman Catholics
National Liberal Party (Panama) politicians
Presidents of Panama
Vice presidents of Panama
Presidential Designates of Colombia